A joaldun is a traditional carnival character in the Basque culture of Navarre, especially in some small villages on the north of  the province: Ituren and Zubieta. His function is to shake some cowbells to warn people about the arrival of the carnivals, which are celebrated annually on the last weekend of January.

Location

The tradition of the Joaldunak takes place in some villages of Navarre, specially in the region of Malerreka. Ituren and Zubieta are located in the Pyrenees, 56.5 km due north of Pamplona, capital city of Navarre. They are situated on the flood plain of the River Ezkurra, a tributary of the River Bidasoa, in the shadow of the Mendaur mountain (1060m). The distance between the two villages is no more than 3 km.

Name
Although the original name is Joaldun, this character is referred to in a number of other ways: kaldurro, ttuntturro, txantxurro... However, the most used but not totally correct name is Zanpantzar.

Zanpantzar
The name Zanpantzar has become more common over the years, although nobody in Zubieta or Ituren uses this name.

Zanpantzar, therefore, means:
 A doll made of straw and fern, which is famous because of his trial, sentencing, and burning in the carnivals of some Basque villages. (This process is part of a cleansing ritual that burns diseases at the same time as the doll.)
 The carnivals.

Costume
The original suit of a Zanpantzar had some characteristics in common, although nowadays each individual group has modified the costume. The features of the costume are:

 A hat named Tunturro on the head, which is a cone (0.5 metres long) and has colourful ribbons and feathers.
 A kerchief around the neck.
 A shirt and short skirt made of sheep skin.
 Two cowbells at the waist.
 A white skirt.
 A sprinkler made of horsehair  in the right hand.
 The footwear are the abarcas.

Variations
Although the costumes of the village are similar to each other, there are some variations:
 The Zubieta costume does not include the fur-lined jacket as the attire of Ituren does.
 The kerchief of Zubieta is a blue square and smaller than that of Ituren, which is red.

Who is a Joalduna?
The tradition was that the costume could only be worn by men, normally over 18 and native of the place, but a few years ago, some girls decided to dress up as Joaldun. However, the children can sometimes march following their older relative's steps.

The carnivals

A Joalduna is the character who warns of the arrival of the carnivals, and is the centrepoint of the celebration. The origin of the carnivals and their objective are not known, but the tradition is thought to be bound to the canching and mysticism. In fact, the Joaldunak are said to have been not only the creatures who protected the cattle, but also the ones who chased the bad spirits away, favouring the good harvests.

The parade
On Monday at noon, the Zubietars (the people of Zubieta) Joaldunak set off for Ituren (the road is only 3 km). The route follows the course of the river Ezkurra, which flows around the Mendaur mountain, geographic accidents that give the region its name: Malerreka ("Malda eta erreka", "Slope and river").

Half way along the route, they will be met by the people of the Ittundar (the people of Ituren) neighborhood of Aurtitz. After that, they will go towards Latsaga's neighborhood to join with the Joaldunak of Ituren. There will start the joint parade of approximately forty or fifty Joalduns (between eighty and a hundred bells) which, after passing through the whole of the centre of Ituren, will end up in the village square. There they will have a communal lunch  to celebrate the brotherhood of the villages.

On Tuesday, the following day, the Ituren Joaldunak will pay a return visit to those of Zubieta. This is the end of the carnivals.

Joaldunen Biltzarra
Every year a celebration is held to honour all the Basque groups that have kept the tradition. This is not confined to just the Navarre villages; many Basque towns have taken up Joaldunak groups since the establishment of the "Joaldunen biltzarra". The festivities include parades, concerts, communal feasts and musical events.

See also
 Gigantes y cabezudos

References

 http://centronavarrodemardelplata.blogspot.com.es/2011/04/carnavales-de-ituren-aurtitz-y-zubieta.html
 http://www.puntubi.com/mitologia/joaldun.htm

Basque culture
Fictional Basque people
Articles containing video clips